Lookout for Hope is the eighth solo album by dobro player Jerry Douglas, released in 2002 (see 2002 in music). It reached number 5 on the Billboard Top New Age chart. The title piece was written by guitarist Bill Frisell who released an album with the same title in 1988.

Guest musicians include Maura O'Connell, Sam Bush, James Taylor, Trey Anastasio and Jeff Coffin.

Track listing

Personnel
Jerry Douglas – dobro, lap steel guitar, vocals
Sam Bush – mandolin
Chris Thile – mandolin
Maura O'Connell – vocals
James Taylor - vocals
Jeff Coffin – saxophone
Stuart Duncan – fiddle
Viktor Krauss – bass
Barry Bales – bass
Byron House – bass
Russ Barenberg – guitar
Trey Anastasio – guitar
Ron Block – guitar
Bryan Sutton – guitar
Larry Atamanuik – drums, conga, percussion
Production notes:
Jerry Douglas – producer
Chas Eller – engineer
Randy LeRoy – mastering
Jon Lupfer – engineer
Tracy Martinson – engineer, editing
Gary Paczosa – engineer
Bil VornDick – engineer
Todd Wells– assistant engineer
Tim O'Dell– assistant engineer
Chuck Ainlay – mixing
Doug DeLong – mixing assistant
Shawne Brown – assistant photographer
Sue Meyer – design
Craig Havighurst – liner notes

Chart positions

2002 albums
Jerry Douglas albums
Sugar Hill Records albums